Prince Wonjang was a Goryeo Royal Prince as the third son of King Taejo and Queen Jeongdeok who married his half sister, Princess Heungbang and had a son and a daughter who would become King Gyeongjong's 5th wife.

References

External links
• Crown Prince Wonjang on Encykorea .

Korean princes
Year of birth unknown
Year of death unknown